Cuando calienta el sol may refer to:

"Cuando calienta el sol" (song), 1961 Spanish song  
Love Me with All Your Heart", English language song, with music based on above song
Cuando calienta el sol (film), 1963 Argentine film
Cuando calienta el Sol, a Spanish TV game show on Spanish Televisión Española station 
Cuando calienta el sol, 2000 film directed by René Cardona Jr.
Cuando calienta el sol... vamos a la playa, 1983 Italian film directed by Mino Guerrini
"Cuando calienta el sol", title of episode 1 of the 2017 TV series Luis Miguel for Netflix and Telemundo